Spineuteleuta celebensis is a species of beetle in the family Cerambycidae, and the only species in the genus Spineuteleuta. It was described by Breuning in 1961.

References

Apomecynini
Beetles described in 1961
Monotypic beetle genera